Karin Andersson may refer to:

 Karin Andersson (politician) (1918–2012), Swedish politician
 Karin Mamma Andersson (born 1962), Swedish artist
 Karin Dreijer (born 1975), Swedish singer and musician